The 2023 Drexler-Automotive Formula Cup will be the 42nd Austria Formula 3 Cup season and the fifth season since Drexler-Automotive took over the title sponsoring of the series.

The 2023 season is planned to be held over eight race weekends across Europe.

Teams and drivers 
Teams and drivers are scheduled to compete in either the Formula 3 Cup or the Formula Renault Cup. Formula 3 entries are divided between the championship class and the open class: The open class comprises European F3, Euroformula Open and Formula Regional engines, while the championship class is reserved for engines with less power.

Formula 3 Cup entries

Race calendar 
The championship will not return to Vallelunga, but will instead return to Spa-Francorchamps after not visiting the circuit in 2022.

References

External links 

 Website of the AFR Cups [German]

Austria Formula 3 Cup
Formula 3
Drexler-Automotive F3 Cup
Drexler-Automotive F3 Cup
Drexler-Automotive F3 Cup